Ronnie Dale Jones (born November 9, 1953) is an American politician and a former Democratic member of the West Virginia House of Delegates representing District 1 between 2010 and 2016.

Education
Jones graduated from Weir High School.

Elections
2012 Jones and Representative Randy Swartzmiller were challenged in the three-way May 8, 2012 Democratic Primary where Jones placed second with 2,530 votes (28.8%), and placed second in the four-way two-position November 6, 2012 General election with 7,128 votes (28.5%), behind Representative Swartzmiller and ahead of Republican nominees Carl Thompson and Justin Bull.
2010 When District 1 Republican Representative Pat McGeehan ran for West Virginia Senate and left a seat open, Jones ran in the four-way May 11, 2010 Democratic Primary and placed second with 1,803 votes (24.7%), and placed second in the three-way two-position November 2, 2010 General election by 38 votes with 4,485 votes (28.4%) behind incumbent Representative Swartzmiller and ahead of Independent candidate Amanda Mesler.
2014 Jones and Swartzmiller were both defeated by former Delegate Pat McGeehan and Mark Zatezalo, both of whom were Republicans.

References

External links
Official page at the West Virginia Legislature

Ronnie Jones at Ballotpedia
Ronnie D. Jones at the National Institute on Money in State Politics

1953 births
Living people
Democratic Party members of the West Virginia House of Delegates
People from Weirton, West Virginia